Nicola or Nichola is a Latinised version of the Greek personal name Nikolaos (Νικόλαος), derived from the nikē meaning "victory", and laos meaning "people", therefore implying the meaning "victory of the people".  Nicola is  both a male and female name, depending on cultural norms. 

Nicola was a frequently given male personal name among the traditional Italian nobility, and was used often in the Middle Ages. The spelling Nikola is widely used in Slavic language speaking areas, reflecting the transliteration of the Cyrillic spelling Никола. The English form of the same name is Nicholas, with Nicolas common in French and Spanish-speaking countries, and Nicolau in Portuguese-speaking countries.  

Nicola has been used as a female name since at least 1150 (the birth date of Lady Nicola de la Haie) and continues as a contemporary female name in Germany, the British Isles and Scandinavia. Less commonly, the name is spelled "Nichola" or "Nickola". There are suggestions the feminization of the name came from incorrectly presuming the name's vowel ending "a" was the female form. The female form of Nicola in Italian is Nicoletta.  Other forms of the female name in other languages include Nicole or Nicolette in French, Nikolett or Nikoletta in Hungarian, Νικολέττα or Νίκη in Greek.

Name days
21 March and 10 September (Hungary)
29 August (Slovakia)
20 November (Czech Republic)
6 December, in line with Saint Nicholas (Bulgaria, Croatia, Germany, Greece, Italy, Latvia, Netherlands, Poland, Slovenia)
19 December, Saint Nikola (Serbia)

Given name: Nicola

A–L
 Nicola Abbagnano (1901–1990), Italian existential philosopher
 Nicola Adams (born 1982), English boxer
 Nicola Amoruso (born 1974), Italian football player
 Nicola Asuni (born 1973), Italian sprinter
 Nicola Barr (born 1996), Australian rules footballer
 Nicola Benedetti (born 1987), Scottish classic violinist
 Nicola Berti (born 1967), Italian football player
 Nicola Best, British statistician
 Nicola Blackwood-Bate (born 1979), British politician
 Nicola Boem (born 1989), Italian road cyclist
 Nicola Bolger (born 1993), Australian football player
 Nicola Bombacci (1879–1945), Italian Marxist revolutionary
 Nicola Brogan, Northern Irish politician
 Nicola Brown (disambiguation), several people
 Nicola Calipari (1953–2005), Italian military intelligence officer with the rank of major general
 Nicola Conte, Italian DJ and producer
 Nicola Coughlan (born 1987), Irish actress
 Nicola Di Bari (born 1940), Italian singer-songwriter
 Nicola Docherty (born 1992), Scottish footballer
 Nicola Edgington (born 1980), British murderer
 Nicola Fairbrother (born 1970), British judoka
 Nicola Filippo (born 1957), American artist
 Nicola Glencross (born 1989), Scottish professional wrestler
 Nicola Gobbo, Australian lawyer
 Nicola Griffith (born 1960), British author
 Nicola de la Haie (died 1230), English landowner and military administrator
 Nicola Jackson (born 1984), British swimmer
 Nicola Jackson (artist) (born 1960), New Zealand artist
 Nicola King, fictional character on the ITV soap opera Emmerdale
 Nicola Larini (born 1964), racing driver
 Nicola Legrottaglie (born 1976), Italian football player
 Nicola Luisotti (born 1961), Italian musician

M–Z
 Nicola Mendelsohn (born 1971), British advertising executive
 Nicola McEwen, FRSE professor of territorial politics at the University of Edinburgh, Centre on Constitutional Change. 
 Nicola Pagett (1945–2021), English actress
 Nicola Peltz (born 1995), American actress
 Nicola Philippaerts (born 1993), Belgian show jumping rider
 Nicola Pierce (born 1969), Irish writer and ghost writer
 Nicola Piovani (born 1946), classical musician
 Nicola Pisano (1220s–1284), Italian sculptor
 Nicola Pozzi (born 1986), Italian football player
 Nicola Ann Raphael (1985–2001), Scottish schoolgirl who committed suicide 
 Nicola Rauti (born 2000), Italian football player
 Nicola Rescigno (1916–2008), Italian-American opera conductor
 Nicola Richards (born 1994), British politician
 Nicola Rizzoli (born 1971), Italian football referee
 Nicola Roberts (born 1985), British popstar, member of Girls Aloud
 Nicola Rossi-Lemeni (1920-1991), Russian-Italian operatic bass
 Nicola Rubinstein, fictional character on the ITV soap opera Coronation Street
 Nicola Sacco (1891–1927), Italian-American anarchist ("Sacco and Vanzetti")
 Nicola Shulman (born 1960), British biographer
 Nicola Smith (born 1949), English bridge player
 Nicola Smith (footballer) (born 1980), New Zealand football player
 Nicola Sturgeon (born 1970), Leader of the Scottish Nationalist Party and the current First Minister of Scotland
 Nicola Tappenden (born 1982), British glamour model
 Nicola Walker (born 1970), British actress
 Nicola Zalewski (born 2002), Polish football player
 Nicola (Okanagan leader) (1780/85 – ~1865), First Nations political figure in the fur trade era of British Columbia, Canada

Given name: Nichola 

 Nichola (fool) (fl. 1560–1570), fool or jester to Mary, Queen of Scots
 Nichola Beck, English badminton player
 Nichola Bruce (born 1953), British film director, cinematographer, screenwriter, and artist
 Nichola Burley (born 1986), British actress
 Nichola Fryday (born 1995), Irish rugby player
 Nichola Goddard (1980–2006), Canadian soldier
 Nichola Gutgold (born 1964), American scholar and academic
 Nichola Holt, contestant on Series 1 of the British TV show Big Brother
 Nichola Hope, one of the British twin artists Nichola and Sarah Hope
 Nichola Kane, broadcast journalist and producer working in Scotland
 Nichola Mallon (born 1979), Northern Irish politician
 Nichola McAuliffe (born 1955), British television and stage actress and writer
 Nichola Pease (born 1961), British fund manager
 Nichola Raihani, British psychologist, professor at University College London
 Nichola Simpson (born 1956), British archer
 Nichola Theobald, British film, television and voice-over actress, television presenter and fashion model

Surname
 Carlos Nicola (born 1973), Uruguayan former footballer
 Davide Nicola (born 1973), Italian football manager and retired player
 Enrico De Nicola (1877–1959), Italian jurist, journalist, politician and provisional Head of State of republican Italy from 1946 to 1948
 Isaac Nicola (1916–1997), Cuban guitarist
 James C. Nicola, American theatre director
 Lewis Nicola (1717–1807), Irish-American military officer during the American Revolutionary War, author of the Newburgh letter
 Marcelo Nicola (born 1971), Argentine-Italian basketball coach and retired player

See also

Nikola, given name
Nicolae (name)
Nicolai (given name)
Nicolaj
Nicolao
Nicolas (given name)
Nicolau
Nicolau (surname)
 Nicolay (disambiguation)
 Nicole (disambiguation)

References

Italian masculine given names
English feminine given names